Lee Seung-Ho (Hangul: 이승호, Hanja: 李承浩) (born September 9, 1981 in Gunsan, Jeollabuk-do, South Korea) is a South Korean baseball relief pitcher for the SK Wyverns of the KBO League. He bats and throws left-handed.

Lee made his pro debut in 2000, and was named Rookie of the Year.

He was also a member of the South Korea national baseball team for the 2000 Olympic Games, where they won the bronze medal in the baseball tournament.

Awards and honors
2000 Rookie of the Year

External links 
 profile

1981 births
2009 World Baseball Classic players
Asian Games medalists in baseball
Baseball players at the 2000 Summer Olympics
Baseball players at the 2002 Asian Games
KBO League pitchers
KBO League Rookie of the Year Award winners
Living people
Lotte Giants players
Medalists at the 2000 Summer Olympics
NC Dinos players
Olympic baseball players of South Korea
Olympic bronze medalists for South Korea
Olympic medalists in baseball
SSG Landers players
South Korean baseball players
Asian Games gold medalists for South Korea
Medalists at the 2002 Asian Games
People from Gunsan
Sportspeople from North Jeolla Province